Rosanna Tavares (born 7 November 1961 in Nanuque, Minas Gerais – died 9 October 2006 in Belo Horizonte, Brazil) was a Brazilian singer, percussionist and guitarist. She was known as the lead singer of Rosanna & Zélia, a duo which received much critical acclaim in much of mainland Europe.

Early life 
Rosanna Tavares enjoyed singing and began participating in her first singing contests when she was as young as eight years old. In 1974, her family moved from Itaúna near the Bahian border, to Belo Horizonte, where they quickly came into contact with the wide-ranging music scene in the capital of Minas Gerais. It was there she was first introduced to Zélia Fonseca, with whom she performed alongside for 30 years.

Career 
After discovered that the band's music had been very successful in Europe, Rosanna & Zélia began more extensive touring, with much time spent in Portugal. Their paths led through France and Finland to Germany, where in 1993, they finally settled in Frankfurt. The duo collaborated with many musicians of Latin American and jazz scene, including Dino Saluzzi, Howard Levy, Katharina Franck, Shantel and German dance producer, Ian Pooley.

Death 
The last two years of her life were determined by her own fight with cancer, which unfortunately proved too difficult. Rosanna Tavares died on 9 October 2006 in Belo Horizonte, Brazil, the city where she had met Zélia Fonseca, and began her career in music.

References

External links 
 Official website – Rosanna & Zélia
 Interview with Rosanna Tavares – Alomusica

1961 births
2006 deaths
People from Minas Gerais
Deaths from cancer in Minas Gerais
20th-century Brazilian women singers
20th-century Brazilian singers
21st-century Brazilian women singers
21st-century Brazilian singers